Teeny can refer to:

 A teenager or a "teenybopper"
 The state of being very small
 Trond Holter, a member of the band Wig Wam
 A small drink sold in Massachusetts and New Hampshire stores composed of water, sugar, food coloring, and artificial flavoring packaged in a small plastic clear barrel-like bottle covered with tin foil (also spelled Teenie)

See also
 TeaNY